John Bunker is an American orchardist, gardener, and apple historian. He is an expert on American apples and their history. He is the founder of the mail order nursery Fedco Trees, a division of the cooperative Fedco Seeds. For most of his life, he has worked to preserve rare old apple varieties from across Maine and the New England region. He founded the Maine Heritage Orchard in Unity, Maine in 2012. The orchard serves as a publicly accessible living monument to Maine's apple trees.

References

Pomologists
Year of birth missing (living people)
Living people
American gardeners